Dolichognatha baforti is a species of spider in the family Tetragnathidae, found in central Africa.

References

Tetragnathidae
Spiders of Africa
Spiders described in 1967